The 1922 California gubernatorial election was held on November 7, 1922. California State Treasurer Friend Richardson defeated incumbent Governor William Stephens in the Republican primary while Los Angeles County District Attorney Thomas L. Woolwine defeated Mattison B. Jones in the Democratic primary. Richardson would defat Woolwine in the general election and would roll back many of the Progressive reforms made by Stephens and his predecessor, Hiram Johnson.

Primaries

Republican primary 
Incumbent Republican Governor William Stephens, who was elected in 1917, sought a second term as governor. By that time, Republicans had grown more conservative than the years prior, pushing against Progressives like Stephens. California State Treasurer Friend Richardson, previously a Progressive in 1914, campaigned on a conservative platform and utilizing a fatigue on Progressive politics in the state. In the Republican primary, Stephens lost to Richardson by 15,000 votes.

Democratic primary 
Los Angeles County District Attorney Thomas L. Woolwine and attorney Mattison B. Jones ran in the Democratic ticket. Woolwine defeated Jones in the primary.

Prohibition primary 
Governor Stephens and Jones cross-filed in the Prohibition primary, but due to Stephens not winning the Republican primary, the Prohibition ticket was unable to run a candidate in the race.

Socialist primary

General election results

References

External links 
 Our Campaigns

Gubernatorial
California
1922
November 1922 events